Connolly station or Dublin Connolly is one of the busiest railway stations in Dublin and Ireland, and is a focal point in the Irish route network. On the North side of the River Liffey, it provides InterCity, Enterprise and commuter services to the north, north-west, south-east and south-west. The north–south Dublin Area Rapid Transit (DART) and Luas light rail services also pass through the station. The station offices are the headquarters of Irish Rail, Iarnród Éireann. Opened in 1844 as Dublin Station, the ornate facade has a distinctive Italianate tower at its centre.

History

On 24 May 1844 the Dublin and Drogheda Railway (DDR) began public operations from an interim terminus at the Royal Canal, and on the same day the foundation stone for what is now Connolly station was laid by Earl de Grey, Lord Lieutenant of Ireland. The station was opened for operations on 29 November 1844 as Dublin Station, but was renamed Amiens Street Station ten years later, after the street where it is located. The terminus building, which was also to be the DDR's headquarters, designed by William Deane Butler, was constructed of Wicklow granite at a cost of £7,000 and opened in 1846. The  flight of steps from the street was to prove difficult for luggage porters and some thirty year later a sloped ramp from opposite Store Street was created to allow step-free pedestrian and vehicle access to platform level.

Originally the station served only a single mainline to Drogheda, and in 1853 through services to Belfast commenced, and an amalgamated company, the Great Northern Railway Ireland (GNRI) taking over operations. In 1879, architect John Lanyon designed a red sandstone and brick headquarters for the GNRI.

In 1891, the City of Dublin Junction Railway opened a separate station called Amiens Street Junction immediately next to the DDR's station. Amiens Street Junction had through platforms, allowing passengers to travel over the Loopline Bridge to Westland Row on the city's Southside and onwards to Rosslare.

In 1937, the MGWR's Broadstone Station was closed, and the services to Sligo were transferred to Westland Row via Amiens Street Junction.

After the amalgamation of the GNR (I) at the end of the 1950s, the two stations were merged into one, simply called Amiens Street. The platforms built by the DDR became platforms 1–4, now used for Intercity and Enterprise trains to Sligo and Belfast; the platforms built by the CDJR became platforms 5–7, used for DART, Commuter and Rosslare services; the DDR's station building became the main passenger entrance and ticket hall; and the CDJR's building fell into disuse.

In 1966, the 50th anniversary of the Easter Rising, Amiens Street was selected as one of fifteen main stations in Ireland to have their names changed to honour patriots executed for their roles in the rising. Amiens Street was renamed Connolly Station, after revolutionary socialist James Connolly.

Services to Galway and Mayo via Mullingar and Athlone had run through Connolly to Pearse from 1937, but were transferred to Heuston Station in the 1970s. Sunday trains to Cork, Limerick and Waterford during the 1960s operated from Connolly platforms 5, 6 and 7 through the Phoenix Park Tunnel, so as to avoid the cost of opening Heuston for the limited Sunday traffic demand at that time.

In 1984, the electrification of parts of the Dublin-Belfast and Dublin to Wexford lines was completed, and DART services commenced. The red-brick station building built by the CDJR was refurbished and reopened for commuters.

During the late 1990s, Connolly Station was completely renovated and partially rebuilt. An entirely new station hall was built, the roof over platforms 1 to 4 was replaced, and a new bar/café and shops were installed. The former DART/Suburban station entrance (CDJR building) and the secondary station hall (further north on Amiens Street) were again closed, but a new entrance on the International Financial Services Centre side was opened. The Luas Red Line began serving the station in 2004.  As part of the preparation for this, the ramp that had been a bus terminus was demolished and replaced with a two-platform tram station connected to the main concourse by escalators and lift.

Docklands railway station
The opening of Docklands Station in March 2007 provided an extra terminus station to take pressure from Connolly. During Monday to Friday peak times, trains from M3 Parkway and Dunboyne arrive at Docklands Station. It also provides an alternative terminus for the Western Commuter line to Mullingar if needed.

Docklands is the planned terminus for services to Navan.

City Centre Resignalling Project
A City Centre resignalling project began in March 2015 and was placed in commission on 15 November 2020. According to Iarnród Éireann, the project has provided the ability to operate 20 trains per hour in both directions through the Howth Junction to Grand Canal Dock line, which caters for Howth DARTs, Malahide DARTs, Northern Commuter trains, Belfast Enterprise services, Sligo InterCity, Western and South Western Commuter services, as well as other services in the Connolly to Grand Canal Dock area. This  means that more trains travel through Connolly rather than terminating; it has also facilitated the use of the Phoenix Park rail tunnel for commuter rail connections.

Connolly Station Area Redevelopment
This project redevelops the east section of the Connolly station area "...to provide 81,500 sq. m. of mixed commercial, residential community and leisure uses comprising 50,200 sq. m. of office accommodation; 106 apartments; a hotel; retail and restaurants and a crèche."

In April 2012, CIÉ received planning approval from Dublin city Council for the redevelopment. In September 2017, CIÉ announced it was seeking a partner to develop Connolly Station site. In 2018, CIÉ appointed Oxley Holdings as its partner for the construction of 697 build-to-rent apartments on Sheriff Street Lower. Planning permission was lodged in April 2019.

Connolly Luas stop
Connolly is an interchange with Dublin's Luas light rail tram system. Built in an area in front of the main station entrance that was previously a bus terminus, the two Luas platforms are covered by a large, segmented canopy. Stairs and lifts directly link the platforms with the station entrance.

When the Luas Red Line commenced service in 2004, Connolly was the sole northern terminus. In 2009, the line was extended eastwards to The Point, and Connolly became the sole station on a spur. Immediately after trams leave the stop, they go through a junction. However, in regular passenger service, trams only ever turn right, heading through the city centre towards Tallaght and Saggart. Around half of all services on the Red Line serve Connolly, and signage suggests that passengers make the short walk to Busáras Luas stop, where trams are more frequent. Connolly Luas stop is closed in the evenings and early mornings.

Connections
While Connolly mainly connects Dublin to the East Coast of Ireland and to Sligo, Dublin Heuston serves the South and West of the country. Connolly Station is connected to Heuston via the Luas tram. Rail links connect the two stations passing through a tunnel under the Phoenix Park. Since 21 November 2016, passenger services regularly use it. Up until then, its main purpose was the transfer of rolling stock and locomotives (the main service depot is at Inchicore, just outside Heuston).

Rail and ferry connections at Dublin Port
The station is connected by bus to Dublin Port with Stena Line ferries from the Ferry Terminal to Holyhead, with connecting trains along the North Wales Coast Line to Bangor, Llandudno Junction, Colwyn Bay, Rhyl, Prestatyn, Chester, Crewe and stations to London Euston. SailRail is promoted as a viable alternative to air transport by using trains and ferries to reach places across the Irish Sea.

Holyhead can also be reached by Irish Ferries or Stena Line from Dublin Port, reached by walking beside the tram lines around the corner from Amiens Street, Dublin into Store Street or by Luas one stop to Busáras where Dublin Bus operates a service to the Ferry Terminal, or Dublin Bus route 53  or to take a taxi.

Former ferry and DART connection at Dún Laoghaire
The ferry service from Dún Laoghaire was discontinued indefinitely in September 2014. Passengers travelled on the DART to Dún Laoghaire to sail using the Stena Line service. Now the route is a bus via Dublin Port to Holyhead as above.

Rail and ferry connections at Rosslare Europort
InterCity trains from Connolly to Rosslare Europort connect with the evening ferry to Fishguard Harbour with through ticketing to places including Carmarthen, Llanelli and Swansea.

Irish Ferries and Stena Line operate ferries from Rosslare Europort to Cherbourg in France. There is also a seasonal route to Roscoff operated by Irish Ferries.

Services
Connolly has seven platforms; four terminals (1-4) and three through - the former Amiens Street Junction station - (5-7). The ticket office is open from 06:30 hrs to 19:00 hrs, Monday to Sunday. The station also features a depot for the Commuter, the InterCity and the Enterprise.

InterCity
There are three InterCity routes served:
The Enterprise service to Belfast Lanyon Place (intermediate stops,  and ). Departs from platform 2
 Sligo Mac Diarmada non-stop to Maynooth and calling at all stations to Sligo. Peak services call at Drumcondra. Departs from platform 1 or 4
 Rosslare Europort, calling at Tara Street, Dublin Pearse, Dun Laoghaire, Bray, Greystones and all stations to Rosslare Europort. Not all services call at Kilcoole. Peak services call at Blackrock, Lansdowne Road and Grand Canal Dock. The 16:33 departure from Connolly to Rosslare Europort offers a connection to ferries to Wales and France. Departs from platform 5

DART
DART services use platforms equipped with overhead wires (Platforms 5, 6, and 7). Terminal Platform 4 is also electrified. As of January 2019, there are 6 DARTs per hour in each direction on weekdays. These are:

Northbound: 3 per hour to Howth and 3 per hour to Malahide.
Southbound: 4 per hour to Bray and 2 per hour to Greystones.

After years of delays, Irish Rail increased the DART frequency to every ten minutes in September 2018, which increased the number of trains per hour in Howth and Malahide to three, and those terminating at Bray to four per hour—but kept Greystones at two per hour, with some peak services also terminating at Dún Laoghaire. It is also planned to expand the DART lines to Maynooth, Hazelhatch and Balbriggan or Drogheda.

Commuter
Some Commuter services run along the DART line as far as Malahide. There are 2 Commuter services per hour in each direction off-peak. These are:

Maynooth from platforms 6 or 7: Calling at all stations to Maynooth.
Drogheda/Dundalk from platform 6 or 7: Calling at Malahide and all stations to Drogheda/Dundalk, with some services also calling at Howth Junction, Clongriffin and Portmarnock.

2 trains per hour to Dublin Pearse from platform 5 or 6.

Peak time services also run to Longford, Hazelhatch, Newbridge, Newry, Dundalk, Balbriggan, Grand Canal Dock and Bray. There are also 3 trains per day from M3 Parkway to Connolly but do not run the return journey.

Statistics

Gallery

See also
 List of railway stations in Ireland
 Dublin Connolly railway station (DART)

References

Bibliography
 
 Johnson, S. (1997). Johnson's Atlas & Gazetteer of the Railways of Ireland, Midland Publishing Ltd. .
 
 (see also RTÉ TV series of same title)

External links

Irish Rail Dublin Connolly Station Website
 Luas Connolly Stop information

Connolly
Iarnród Éireann stations in Dublin (city)
Railway stations opened in 1844
Railway stations served by Enterprise
Luas Red Line stops in Dublin (city)
1844 establishments in Ireland
Railway stations in the Republic of Ireland opened in 1844